Huoxian Town is a town located on Tongzhou District, Beijing, China. It borders Xiji Town in its northeast, Anping Town in its east, Yongledian Town in its south, Yujiawu Hui Township in its southwest, and Zhangjiawan Town in its northwest. The 2020 Chinese census counted 68,466 residents for this town.

History

Administration divisions 
As of 2021, Huoxian Town was constituted by 64 subdivisions, including 3 residential communities and 61 villages:

See also 

 List of township-level divisions of Beijing

References 

Towns in Beijing
Tongzhou District, Beijing